Lessig is a surname. Notable people with the surname include:

Adolph Lessig (1869–1935), American union leader
Lawrence Lessig (born 1961), American academic, attorney, and political activist

See also
Lessing